Hypanartia, commonly called mapwings, is a butterfly genus in the family Nymphalidae found from Mexico to South America.

Species
 Hypanartia bella (Fabricius, 1793) – Bella mapwing
 Hypanartia celestia Lamas, Willmott & Hall, 2001
 Hypanartia cinderella Lamas, Willmott & Hall, 2001 – Cinderella admiral
 Hypanartia charon (Hewitson, 1878)
 Hypanartia christophori Jasiñski, 1998
 Hypanartia dione (Latreille, 1813) – banded mapwing
 Hypanartia fassli Willmott, Hall & Lamas, 2001 – Colombian admiral
 Hypanartia godmanii (Bates, 1864) – Godman's mapwing, splendid mapwing
 Hypanartia kefersteini (Doubleday, 1847) – red mapwing
 Hypanartia lethe (Fabricius, 1793) – orange mapwing
 Hypanartia lindigii (C. & R. Felder, 1862)
 Hypanartia paullus (Fabricius, 1793) – Antillean mapwing
 Hypanartia splendida Rothschild, 1903
 Hypanartia trimaculata Willmott, Hall & Lamas, 2001 – reddish mapwing

References

Nymphalini
Nymphalidae of South America
Butterfly genera
Taxa named by Jacob Hübner